Fly Me to the Moon is the debut studio album by American singer-songwriter Bobby Womack. The album was released in January 1969, by Minit Records.

Track listing
All tracks composed by Bobby Womack; except where indicated

Personnel
Bobby Womack - guitar, vocals
Reggie Young - guitar
Mike Leech - bass
Bobby Wood - piano
Bobby Emmons - organ
Gene Chrisman - drums
Bobby Womack, Mike Leech - arrangements

References

1969 debut albums
Bobby Womack albums
Albums produced by Chips Moman
Minit Records albums